Gelechia is a genus of moths in the family Gelechiidae. The type species is Gelechia rhombella.

Species

Subgenus Gelechia
Gelechia asinella (Hubner, 1796)
Gelechia aspoecki Huemer, 1992
Gelechia atlanticella (Amsel, 1955)
Gelechia basipunctella Herrich-Schaffer, 1854
Gelechia cuneatella Douglas, 1852
Gelechia dujardini Huemer, 1991
Gelechia hippophaella (Schrank, 1802)
Gelechia jakovlevi Krulikovsky, 1905
Gelechia mediterranea Huemer, 1991
Gelechia muscosella Zeller, 1839
Gelechia nervosella (Zerny, 1927)
Gelechia nigra (Haworth, 1828)
Gelechia rhombella (Denis & Schiffermuller, 1775)
Gelechia rhombelliformis Staudinger, 1871
Gelechia sabinellus (Zeller, 1839)
Gelechia scotinella Herrich-Schaffer, 1854
Gelechia senticetella (Staudinger, 1859)
Gelechia sestertiella Herrich-Schaffer, 1854
Gelechia sororculella (Hubner, 1817)
Gelechia turpella (Denis & Schiffermuller, 1775)

Subgenus Mesogelechia Omelko, 1986
Gelechia sirotina Omelko, 1986
Unplaced to subgenus

Gelechia abjunctella Walker, 1864
Gelechia aglossella Walker, 1866
Gelechia albatella Walker, 1864
Gelechia albisparsella (Chambers, 1872)
Gelechia albomaculata Omelko, 1986
Gelechia allomima Meyrick, 1938
Gelechia allotria Meyrick, 1925
Gelechia anagramma Meyrick, 1921
Gelechia anarsiella Chambers, 1877
Gelechia angustella Walker, 1864
Gelechia anomorcta Meyrick, 1926
Gelechia anthochra Lower, 1896
Gelechia anthracopa Meyrick, 1922
Gelechia arotrias Meyrick, 1908
Gelechia atrofusca Omelko, 1986
Gelechia badiomaculella Chambers, 1872
Gelechia bathrochlora Meyrick, 1932
Gelechia benitella Barnes & Busck, 1920
Gelechia bergiella Teich, 1886
Gelechia bianulella (Chambers, 1875)
Gelechia bistrigella (Chambers, 1872)
Gelechia capiteochrella Chambers, 1875
Gelechia caudatae Clarke, 1934
Gelechia chionomima Meyrick, 1929
Gelechia clandestina Omelko, 1986
Gelechia clopica Meyrick, 1931
Gelechia conditor Omelko, 1986
Gelechia cuneifera Walsingham, 1911
Gelechia cuspidatella Turati, 1934
Gelechia delapsa Meyrick, 1931
Gelechia delodectis Meyrick, 1938
Gelechia desiliens Meyrick, 1923
Gelechia diacmota Meyrick, 1932
Gelechia discostrigella Chambers, 1875
Gelechia dolbyi (Walsingham, 1911)
Gelechia dromicella Busck, 1910
Gelechia dyariella Busck, 1903
Gelechia dzunmodi Lvovsky & Piskunov, 1989
Gelechia ekhingolica Lvovsky & Piskunov, 1989
Gelechia elephantopis Meyrick, 1936
Gelechia epiphloea Meyrick, 1913
Gelechia epistolica Meyrick, 1931
Gelechia exclarella Möschler, 1890
Gelechia exposita (Meyrick, 1926)
Gelechia farinosa Teich, 1899
Gelechia fecunda Meyrick, 1918
Gelechia flavipalpella Walsingham, 1881
Gelechia flexurella Clemens, 1860
Gelechia frequens (Meyrick, 1921)
Gelechia fuscooculata Omelko, 1986
Gelechia gammanella Walker, 1864
Gelechia goniospila Meyrick, 1931
Gelechia gracula (Meyrick, 1929)
Gelechia griseaella (Chambers, 1872)
Gelechia griseella (Chambers, 1874)
Gelechia grisseochrella Chambers, 1875
Gelechia haifella Amsel, 1935
Gelechia hetaeria Walsingham, 1911
Gelechia horiaula Meyrick, 1918
Gelechia hyoscyamella (Rebel, 1912)
Gelechia impurgata Walsingham, 1911
Gelechia inconspicua Omelko, 1986
Gelechia inferialis (Meyrick, 1918)
Gelechia intermedia Braun, 1923
Gelechia invenustella Berg, 1876
Gelechia junctipunctella Caradja, 1920
Gelechia lactiflora Meyrick, 1921
Gelechia leptospora Meyrick, 1932
Gelechia liberata Meyrick, 1910
Gelechia longipalpella Teich, 1899
Gelechia lynceella Zeller, 1873
Gelechia machinata (Meyrick, 1929)
Gelechia maculatusella Chambers, 1875
Gelechia mandella Busck, 1904
Gelechia marmoratella Walker, 1864
Gelechia melanoptila (Lower, 1897)
Gelechia mimella Clemens, 1860
Gelechia monella Busck, 1904
Gelechia mundata (Meyrick, 1929)
Gelechia notabilis Omelko, 1986
Gelechia obscurella Chambers, 1872
Gelechia ocherfuscella Chambers, 1875
Gelechia ochrocorys Meyrick, 1936
Gelechia omphalopis Meyrick, 1926
Gelechia ophiaula Meyrick, 1931
Gelechia overhaldensis Strand, 1920
Gelechia packardella Chambers, 1877
Gelechia pallidagriseella Chambers, 1874
Gelechia palpialbella Chambers, 1875
Gelechia panella Busck, 1903
Gelechia paraula (Meyrick, 1916)
Gelechia paroxynta Meyrick, 1931
Gelechia petraea Walsingham, 1911
Gelechia picrogramma Meyrick, 1929
Gelechia pisarevi Lvovsky & Piskunov, 1989
Gelechia pistaciae Filipjev, 1934
Gelechia platydoxa Meyrick, 1923
Gelechia praestantella Lucas, 1956
Gelechia repetitrix Meyrick, 1931
Gelechia rescissella Zeller, 1852
Gelechia resecta Meyrick, 1913
Gelechia ribesella Chambers, 1875
Gelechia rileyella (Chambers, 1872)
Gelechia sachalinensis Matsumura, 1931
Gelechia sattleri Piskunov, 1982
Gelechia sematica (Meyrick, 1913)
Gelechia sonorensis Walsingham, 1911
Gelechia stenacma Meyrick, 1935
Gelechia suspensa Meyrick, 1923
Gelechia teleiodella Omelko, 1986
Gelechia tetraleuca Meyrick, 1918
Gelechia thoracestrigella Chambers, 1875
Gelechia thymiata (Meyrick, 1929)
Gelechia trachydyta (Meyrick, 1920)
Gelechia traducella Busck, 1914
Gelechia tribalanota Meyrick, 1935
Gelechia turangella Lvovsky & Piskunov, 1989
Gelechia unistrigella Chambers, 1873
Gelechia veneranda Walsingham, 1911
Gelechia versutella Zeller, 1873
Gelechia wacoella Chambers, 1874

Placement unclear
Gelechia amorphella Chambers, 1877
Gelechia discoanulella Chambers, 1875

Former species

Gelechia acanthopis Meyrick, 1932
Gelechia adapterella Walker, 1864
Gelechia bufo Walsingham, 1911
Gelechia cacoderma Walsingham, 1911
Gelechia caespitella Zeller, 1877
Gelechia cerussata Walsingham, 1911
Gelechia chlorocephala Meyrick, 1932
Gelechia concinna Walsingham, 1911
Gelechia creberrima Walsingham, 1911
Gelechia crudescens Meyrick, 1920
Gelechia elaboratella Braun, 1923
Gelechia flammulella Walsingham, 1897
Gelechia gnathodoxa Meyrick, 1926
Gelechia lapidescens Meyrick, 1916
Gelechia nephelophracta Meyrick, 1932
Gelechia neptica Walsingham, 1911
Gelechia nigripectus Walsingham, 1911
Gelechia nucifer Walsingham, 1911
Gelechia ophiomorpha Meyrick, 1935
Gelechia pertinens Meyrick, 1931
Gelechia pleroma Walsingham, 1911
Gelechia protozona Meyrick, 1926
Gelechia rhypodes Walsingham, 1911
Gelechia scotodes Walsingham, 1911
Gelechia synthetica Walsingham, 1911
Gelechia tannuolella Rebel, 1917
Gelechia tragicella (Heyden, 1865)
Gelechia xylobathra Meyrick, 1936
Gelechia xylophaea Meyrick, 1921

References

External links

 Checklist of Gelechiidae in Neotropical Region based on revision of Becker, 1984

 
Gelechiini